United Nations Security Council Resolution 29, adopted unanimously on August 12, 1947, upon having reviewed and in some cases, re-reviewed applications for membership in the United Nations by Albania, Mongolia, Transjordan, Ireland, Portugal, Hungary, Italy, Romania, Austria, Mutawakkilite Kingdom of Yemen, Bulgaria and Dominion of Pakistan. The Council recommended that the General Assembly admit Yemen and Pakistan.

See also
List of United Nations Security Council Resolutions 1 to 100 (1946–1953)

References
Text of the Resolution at undocs.org

External links
 

 0029

 0029
 0029
 0029
 0029
1947 in Pakistan
Kingdom of Yemen
1947 in Bulgaria
 0029
1947 in Romania
 0029
1947 in Albania
 0029
1947 in Austria
 0029
1947 in Mongolia
 0029
1947 in Ireland
 0029
1947 in Jordan
 0029
1947 in Portugal
 0029
1947 in Italy
 0029
1947 in Hungary
August 1947 events